The 2011–12 Quad City Mallards season was the second season in the Central Hockey League of the CHL franchise in Moline, Illinois.

Regular season

Conference standings

Transactions
The Mallards have been involved in the following transactions during the 2011–12 season.

Trades

Roster

|}

See also
 2011–12 CHL season

References

External links
 2011–12 Quad City Mallards season at Pointstreak

Q
Q